Limes, lindens and basswoods (Tilia species) are used as food plants by the larvae of some Lepidoptera species including:

Monophagous
Species which feed exclusively on Tilia

Bucculatricidae
 Bucculatrix improvisa – only on American linden (T. americana)
 Coleophoridae
 Coleophora tiliaefoliella

Polyphagous
Species which feed on Tilia among other plants

Bucculatricidae
 Bucculatrix thoracella
 Coleophoridae
 Several Coleophora case-bearers, such as:
 C. albovanescens
 C. anatipennella
 Geometridae
 Alcis repandata (mottled beauty)
 Crocallis elinguaria (scalloped oak)
 Epirrita autumnata (autumnal moth)
 Erannis defoliaria (mottled umber)
 Hemithea aestivaria (common emerald)
 Odontopera bidentata (scalloped hazel)
 Operophtera brumata (winter moth)
 Lymantriidae
 Euproctis chrysorrhoea (brown-tail)
 Lymantria dispar (gypsy moth)
 Noctuidae
Acronicta aceris (sycamore) – recorded on large-leaved lime (T. platyphyllos)
 Acronicta psi (grey dagger)
 Amphipyra pyramidea (copper underwing)
 Cosmia trapezina (dun-bar)
 Eupsilia transversa (satellite)
 Orthosia gothica (Hebrew character) – recorded on large-leaved lime (T. platyphyllos)
 Notodontidae
Phalera bucephala (buff-tip)
 Ptilodon capucina (coxcomb prominent)
 Nymphalidae
 Limenitis arthemis (American white admiral/red-spotted purple) – recorded on American linden (T. americana)
 Sphingidae
 Ceratomia amyntor (elm sphinx)
 Mimas tiliae (lime hawk-moth)

References

External links

Tilia
+Lepidoptera